Abraham Yehudah Khein (1878 in Chernigov – 5 October 1957) was a Hasidic Rabbi in the Ukrainian town Nyezhin. Rabbi Khein was a pacifist anarchist. He belonged to the Hasidic Chabad tradition by family descent and spiritual training.

Khein was an Anti-Zionist, committed to pacifism and nonviolence particularly during the Jewish insurgency in Mandatory Palestine. He tried to relate his readings of Leo Tolstoy and Pyotr Kropotkin to Kabbalah and Hasidism. Rabbi Khein deeply respected Kropotkin, whom he called "the Tzadik of the new world", whose "soul is as pure as crystal"

Rabbi Khein's most known work is his three-volume collection of essays,  ("In the Kingdom of Judaism").

See also
 List of peace activists

References 

Ukrainian anarchists
Ukrainian pacifists
Tolstoyans
Anarcho-pacifists
Orthodox Jewish anarchists
Jewish pacifists
1878 births
1957 deaths
Chabad-Lubavitch rabbis
Ukrainian Orthodox rabbis